Zavet may refer to:

 Zavet Municipality, a municipality in Razgrad Province, Bulgaria
 Zavet (town), a town in Zavet Municipality, Razgrad Province, Bulgaria
 Zavet (village), a village in Sungurlare Municipality, Burgas Province, Bulgaria
 Promise Me This, a 2007 Serbian film

or:
Zavet Saddle, a saddle of elevation in Imeon Range